Little London is a village in Suffolk, to the south of Combs and Stowmarket.

Villages in Suffolk
Mid Suffolk District